Looney Tunes Super Stars is a series of nine Looney Tunes DVDs consisting of two Bugs Bunny DVDs and other characters who got their own collections. It started on August 10, 2010 and ran until April 23, 2013. The series consists of:

Although Super Stars is the semi-successor to the Looney Tunes Golden Collection series, the true successor of the Golden Collection is the Looney Tunes Platinum Collection. However, unlike the Platinum Collection, there aren’t any special features in the Super Stars series. Jerry Beck stated on Stu's Show on December 14, 2011 that he will be picking some cartoons for the future of the Super Stars line.

There were originally plans to do another Daffy Duck release. According to Jerry Beck on Stu's Show after the release of the final volume of the Platinum Collection series, the Super Stars series came to an abrupt end due to low sales and lack of money to remaster the never-before-released cartoon shorts, making any other future character Super Stars releases, like Elmer Fudd, Yosemite Sam and Speedy Gonzales extinct. The Pepe Le Pew: Zee Best of Zee Best and the Sylvester and Hippety Hopper: Marsupial Mayhem DVDs are now the only home media releases from Warner Bros. to have a major Looney Tunes character's (and two minor Looney Tunes characters') entire filmography featured.

Controversies 
The first two Looney Tunes Super Stars had released the majority the cartoons from the post-1953 era in a 1:85 widescreen format. Warner Bros. has stated the reason for this was because that is how the post-1953 cartoons were shown in theaters, which made many collectors upset, as cartoons were filmed in Academy ratio, not widescreen at that time (CinemaScope shorts being the only exception and Warner never filmed any LT shorts in CinemaScope). On December 1, 2010, animation expert Jerry Beck explained on the Shokus Internet Radio call-in talk program, Stu's Show that Warner aimed this series, not at collectors, but at the mass market who expect it to fit on their widescreen T.V.s. He speculated that at some point down the road there will probably be a douple-dip release of those shorts in a collector's DVD version with the video in full-frame format. However, the Foghorn Leghorn DVD includes both the widescreen and the Academy ratio of the cartoons on the same disc and further releases provide only fullscreen viewing.

On the Tweety and Sylvester: Feline Fwenzy and Bugs Bunny: Wascally Wabbit DVDs, all of the cartoons have been released previously on the Golden Collection series.

References 

Looney Tunes home video releases